McQueeney is an unincorporated community and census-designated place (CDP) in Guadalupe County, Texas, United States. The population was 2,545 at the 2010 census. It is part of the San Antonio Metropolitan Statistical Area.

History
German settlers first moved to the area around 1870. When the Galveston, Harrisburg & San Antonio railroad was built through the area in 1876, the stop was named "Hilda". In 1900, a local businessman, C. F. Blumberg, built a general store east of the rail stop. Hoping to get the railroad to move the stop from Hilda to his store, Blumberg called the site "McQueeney", in honor of the local railroad superintendent. The railroad was not persuaded, but the post office that opened in 1900 was called McQueeney.

Lake McQueeney was created in 1925 by damming the Guadalupe River. Treasure Island, a wealthy enclave of homeowners on the lake, has flooded several times, most notably in 1972, 1998, and 2002.

Geography
McQueeney is located in central Guadalupe County at  (29.598103, -98.043468), on the west side of the Guadalupe River.

Demographics
As of the census of 2000, there were 2,527 people, 1,018 households, and 722 families residing in the CDP. The population density was 608.8 people per square mile (235.1/km2). There were 1,269 housing units at an average density of 305.7/sq mi (118.1/km2). The racial makeup of the CDP was 87.61% White, 0.75% African American, 0.79% Native American, 0.24% Asian, 0.16% Pacific Islander, 8.79% from other races, and 1.66% from two or more races. Hispanic or Latino of any race were 21.29% of the population.

There were 1,018 households, out of which 28.7% had children under the age of 18 living with them, 60.4% were married couples living together, 7.0% had a female householder with no husband present, and 29.0% were non-families. 23.2% of all households were made up of individuals, and 7.8% had someone living alone who was 65 years of age or older. The average household size was 2.48 and the average family size was 2.94.

In the CDP, the population was spread out, with 23.1% under the age of 18, 8.0% from 18 to 24, 26.6% from 25 to 44, 28.0% from 45 to 64, and 14.3% who were 65 years of age or older. The median age was 40 years. For every 100 females, there were 102.8 males. For every 100 females age 18 and over, there were 99.1 males.

The median income for a household in the CDP was $42,317, and the median income for a family was $47,464. Males had a median income of $28,333 versus $23,375 for females. The per capita income for the CDP was $21,079. About 2.0% of families and 4.3% of the population were below the poverty line, including 2.8% of those under age 18 and 4.5% of those age 65 or over.

Education
McQueeney is served by the Seguin Independent School District.

Notable people
Alan Schoolcraft (born 1952), former member of the Texas House of Representatives from Bexar County, has resided in McQueeney.

References

External links
 

Census-designated places in Guadalupe County, Texas
Census-designated places in Texas
Unincorporated communities in Guadalupe County, Texas
Unincorporated communities in Texas
Greater San Antonio
Populated places on the Guadalupe River (Texas)
Populated coastal places in Texas